Pulju Wilderness Area is a wilderness reserve in the municipalities of Enontekiö and Kittilä in Lapland, Finland. It was established in 1991 like all the other wilderness areas in Lapland.

The Pulju area is especially known for its peculiar landscape forms from (probably) the latest ice age: worm-like winding Pulju moraines.

See also
 Pulju moraine
 Wilderness areas of Finland

References

Protected areas established in 1991
1991 establishments in Finland
Wilderness areas of Finland